Daniel Foder Holm (born 7 April 1983) is a Danish former professional cyclist.

Major results
2008
1st GP Nordjylland 
2009
1st Fyen Rundt
4th Ringerike GP
2011
1st  Team time trial, National Road Championships
2nd Overall Tour of Norway
3rd Rogaland GP
2012
 4th Overall Tour of China I 
1st Stage 1 (TTT)

References

External links

1983 births
Living people
Danish male cyclists